The Sanctuary of the Madonna of San Luca is a basilica church in Bologna, northern Italy, sited atop a forested hill, Colle or Monte della Guardia, some 300 metres above the city plain, just south-west of the historical centre of the city.

While a road now leads up to the sanctuary, it is also possible to reach it along a 3.8 km monumental roofed arcade (Portico di San Luca) consisting of 666 arches, which was built in 1674–1793. It was meant to protect the icon as it was paraded up the hill. A yearly procession from the Cathedral of San Pietro in the centre of Bologna to the Sanctuary goes along this path. Originally the arches held icons or chapels erected by the patron family.

History

A church or chapel existed on the hill for about a thousand years. Tradition holds that in the 12th-century, a pilgrim from the Byzantine empire came to Bologna with an icon of the Virgin from the temple of Saint Sofia in Constantinople. In 1160, the bishop of Bologna Gerardo Grassi assigned the icon to a small hermitage-chapel atop the hill that was tended by two holy women, Azzolina and Beatrice Guezi. Construction of a church began in 1193. In 1294, some friars of the Dominican order from the monastery of Ronzano came to the site, and the order remained here until the Napoleonic suppression of 1799.

The present church was constructed in 1723 using the designs of Carlo Francesco Dotti. The lateral external tribunes were built by Carlo Francesco's son, Giovanni Giacomo, using his father's plans. The centrally planned sanctuary has painted artworks by Domenico Pestrini, Donato Creti (second chapel on right); Guido Reni (Assumption in the third altar on the right), Giuseppe Maria Mazza in chapel of St. Anthony of Padua, Vittorio Bigari (frescoes) and Guercino (sacristy). Stucco works are by A. Borelli and G. Calegari and statues by Angelo Piò.

Cycling
The road leading up to the church is often used in professional cycling races. The Italian autumn classic race Giro dell'Emilia finishes on a circuit where the riders have to climb the road several times. It has also been used in the Giro d'Italia, where it made its debut in 1956 in an individual time trial stage won by Charly Gaul.

Cable car

From 1931 to 1976 an aerial cable car operated from the base of the hill on the outskirts of Bologna, to the summit. The total distance covered in the 7 minute travel time was 1328m with a vertical difference of 220m. The operation was closed due to increased usage of private transport to ascend the hill. The top station is abandoned but intact, the bottom station has been converted into apartments but remains structurally the same, and the single pylon remains intact in a field.

External links
Municipality of Bologna

References

Basilica churches in Bologna
Shrines to the Virgin Mary
Baroque architecture in Bologna
18th-century Roman Catholic church buildings in Italy
Roman Catholic churches completed in 1765
1193 establishments in Europe
12th-century establishments in Italy
1723 establishments in Italy
Monuments and historic places of Bologna